The 2013 Wilson Security Sandown 500 was an endurance race for V8 Supercars. It was staged at the Sandown International Motor Raceway in Victoria, Australia on 15 September 2013 and was Race 28 of the 2013 V8 Supercars Championship. The race, which was the 43rd "Sandown 500", was won by Jamie Whincup and Paul Dumbrell driving a Holden VF Commodore.

Results

Race 

 Fastest race lap: 1:09.9061 - Jamie Whincup

Championship standings after the race
 After 28 of 36 races.

Drivers' Championship standings

Teams' Championship standings

 Note: Only the top five positions are included for both sets of standings.

References

External links
 Official Result, 2013 Sandown 500 - V8 Supercar Championship - Race 28, racing.natsoft.com.au, as archived at web.archive.org

Wilson Security Sandown 500
Motorsport at Sandown
Pre-Bathurst 500
September 2013 sports events in Australia